Paul the Venetian or the Venetian Chohan is one of the "Masters of the Ancient Wisdom" in the teachings of Theosophy and is regarded as one of the ascended masters in the Ascended Master Teachings (also collectively called the Great White Brotherhood).  He is regarded as the Master of the Third Ray (see Seven Rays).  According to the Church Universal and Triumphant, his final life was his incarnation as the artist Paolo Veronese (1528-1588), after which he is said to have become an Ascended Master.

Paul the Venetian's etheric retreat

According to Elizabeth Clare Prophet, Paul the Venetian's "Ascended Master Retreat" is believed to be in an enormous mansion called the "Chateau de Liberte" on the etheric plane above an area of southern France called Provence.  This mansion is supposed to be larger than the Versailles Palace and have thousands of rooms decorated with copies of paintings (rendered in etheric matter) from all civilizations and eras of human history. Members of the Church Universal and Triumphant, the largest organization adherent to the Ascended Master Teachings, practice meditation exercises which, they are taught, will allow them to visit this retreat on the etheric plane in their dreams.

Previous incarnations
The Theosophical author C.W. Leadbeater mentioned a Venetian Chohan, but did not name him Paul or identify him with Veronese. Some of the lesser known Ancient Wisdom groups maintain that Paul the Venetian was incarnated as Plotinus.

In the Ascended Master Teachings, Paul the Venetian is believed to have been incarnated as a "Minister of Culture" in the government of Atlantis, as one of the architects of the pyramids in Ancient Egypt, and as an artist (mural painter) in the Inca Empire.

Ascension
According to the Ascended Master Teachings, Paul the Venetian ascended on April 19, 1588.

Twin flame

According to Elizabeth Clare Prophet (the founder and former head of the Ascended Master Teachings organization the Church Universal and Triumphant), Paul the Venetian’s twin flame (celestial wife)  was incarnated as Ruth Hawkins and is now known as the Lady Master Adoremus.  Ruth Hawkins was born in Topeka, Kansas in 1907 and died (“ascended”) in 1995 in Albuquerque, New Mexico. She was an artist who painted many portraits of the ascended masters and was very devoted to Paul the Venetian, addressing many "violet flame decrees" toward him. She was a member of the "I AM" Activity and later of The Bridge to Freedom.  According to Elizabeth Clare Prophet, "Lady Master Adoremus" is now known as the Goddess of Beauty.

However, according to the Ascended Master Teachings organization the Inner Light-Workers, Paul the Venetian’s twin flame  (celestial wife) is Lady Master Chi Seong Li, who was incarnated as a widely educated Chinese lady of noble birth who, following changes in her family's circumstances, taught basic lessons including mathematics to the young children of a Japanese noble's household.  Lady Master Chi Seong Li is said to govern the realm of logic, mathematics and form.

Skeptical view

The scholar K. Paul Johnson maintains that the "Masters" that Madame Blavatsky wrote about and produced letters from were actually idealizations of people who were her mentors.

Also see the article “Talking to the Dead and Other Amusements” by Paul Zweig in New York Times October 5, 1980, which maintains that Madame Blavatsky's revelations were fraudulent.

Notes

Sources
 Leadbeater, C.W.  The Masters and the Path  Adyar, Madras, India: 1925—Theosophical Publishing House
 Prophet, Mark L. and Elizabeth Clare  Lords of the Seven Rays Livingston, Montana, U.S.A.:1986 - Summit University Press

Further reading
 Campbell, Bruce F. A History of the Theosophical Movement Berkeley:1980 University of California Press
 Godwin, Joscelyn The Theosophical Enlightenment Albany, New York: 1994 State University of New York Press
 Johnson, K. Paul The Masters Revealed: Madam Blavatsky and Myth of the Great White Brotherhood Albany, New York: 1994 State University of New York Press
 Melton, J. Gordon Encyclopedia of American Religions 5th Edition New York:1996 Gale Research  ISSN 1066-1212 Chapter 18--"The Ancient Wisdom Family of Religions" Pages 151-158; see chart on page 154 listing Masters of the Ancient Wisdom; Also see Section 18, Pages 717-757 Descriptions of various Ancient Wisdom religious organizations

Ascended Master Teachings
Masters of the Ancient Wisdom